Show-Ya 20th Anniversary The Best is a CD and DVD collection of songs and videos of the Japanese hard rock band Show-Ya. The Anniversary collection was released in 2005 in Japan, just after the band's reunion.

Track listing

CD
"Genkai Lovers" (限界 Lovers - L.A. Mix) - 3:58
"Look at Me!" (2005 version) - 5:40
"Metallic Woman" - 6:18
"Fire" - 5:00
"Mou Friend Wa Iranai" (もうフレンドはいらない) - 4:11
"S・T・O・P (But I Can’t…)" - 4:02
"Au Revoir" - 5:17
"Come On!" (2005 version) - 3:41
"Inori" (祈り) - 4:37
"Rock Train" - 2:48
"Mr. J" - 3:33
"Kaigenrei no Machi - Cry for the Freedom" (戒厳令の街 ／Cry for the Freedom) - 4:50
"Bad Boys" - 3:56
"Watashi Wa Arashi" (私は嵐 - L.A Mix) - 4:02
"Kagirinaku Haruka na Jiyuu E (Go Again)" (限りなくはるかな自由へ～Go Again～) - 4:46

DVD
 "Shidokenaku Emotion" (しどけなくエモーション)
 "One Way Heart"  
 "Sono Ato De Koroshitai" (その後で殺したい)
 "Mizu no Naka no Toubousha" (水の中の逃亡者)
 "Kodoku no Meiro (Labyrinth)" (孤独の迷路（ラビリンス）)
 "Aisazu ni Irarenai - Still Be Hangin' On" (愛さずにいられない - Still Be Hangin' On)
 "Genkai Lovers" (限界 Lovers)
 "Watashi Wa Arashi" (私は嵐)
 "Sakebi" (叫び)
 "Gambling" (ギャンブリング)

References

Show-Ya albums
2005 compilation albums
2005 video albums
Music video compilation albums
EMI Records compilation albums
EMI Records video albums
Japanese-language compilation albums